Loxopholis rugiceps is a species of lizard in the family Gymnophthalmidae. It is found in Colombia and Panama.

References

Loxopholis
Reptiles described in 1869
Taxa named by Edward Drinker Cope